"The Horizon Has Been Defeated" is a song written and performed by American singer-songwriter Jack Johnson. It was released as the second single from his album, On and On (2003), on March 10, 2003. The single reached  31 on the US Billboard Modern Rock Tracks chart and No. 43 in New Zealand.

Charts

Release history

References

External links
 "The Horizon Has Been Defeated" lyrics

2003 singles
2003 songs
Jack Johnson (musician) songs
Song recordings produced by Mario Caldato Jr.
Songs written by Jack Johnson (musician)
Universal Music Group singles